James Ridley Osgood Perkins (May 16, 1892 – September 21, 1937) was an American actor.

Life and career
Perkins was born in West Newton, Massachusetts, son of Henry Phelps Perkins Jr., and his wife, Helen Virginia (née Anthony). His maternal grandfather was wood engraver Andrew Varick Stout Anthony. He was a graduate of Harvard College.

Perkins made his Broadway debut in 1924 in the George S. Kaufman – Marc Connelly play Beggar on Horseback. In the next 12 years, he would appear in 24 Broadway productions, including The Front Page and Uncle Vanya.

Despite his success as a leading man in the theatre, Hollywood viewed him as a character actor. He appeared in 12 silent films, including Puritan Passions, before moving to talkies such as  Scarface and Gold Diggers of 1937.

"The best actor I ever worked with was Osgood Perkins," Louise Brooks told Kevin Brownlow. "You know what makes an actor great to work with? Timing. You don't have to feel anything. It's like dancing with a perfect dancing partner. Osgood Perkins would give you a line so that you would react perfectly. It was timing -- because emotion means nothing." Brooks and Perkins appeared together in Love 'Em and Leave 'Em (1926). 
 
On September 21, 1937, Perkins died of a heart attack in his bathtub shortly after playing in a performance of Susan and God.

Perkins was inducted, posthumously, into the American Theatre Hall of Fame in 1981.

Personal life 
Perkins married Janet Esselstyn Rane in 1922. They had one child, actor Anthony Perkins.

Filmography

References

External links

 
 
 Osgood Perkins portrait gallery NY Public Library

1892 births
1937 deaths
American male film actors
American male stage actors
Male actors from Boston
American people of English descent
20th-century American male actors
Harvard College alumni